This is a list of microconsoles from the first created to the present, in chronological order. This list may not be complete yet.

The microconsole market started in the seventh generation era of video game consoles, and this market has quickly grown during the eighth generation era of gaming consoles, at the same time as other types of video game consoles.

List

See also 
Comparison of digital media players
List of best-selling game consoles
List of video game console emulators
List of video game consoles
List of home video game consoles
List of handheld game consoles
Cloud gaming
List of dedicated consoles
List of retro style video game consoles

References

 
Microconsoles